The Saint George Island gecko (Aristelliger georgeensis) is a species of lizard in the family Sphaerodactylidae. The species is endemic to the Caribbean.

Geographic range
A. georgeensis is found in Belize, on Colombian Caribbean islands, on Honduran Caribbean islands, and in Caribbean Mexico.

Reproduction
A. georgeensis is oviparous.

References

Further reading
Schwartz A, Thomas R (1975). A Check-list of West Indian Ampbibians and Reptiles. Carnegie Museum of Natural History Special Publication No. 1. Pittsburgh, Pennsylvania: Carnegie Museum of Natural History. 216 pp. (Aristelliger georgeensis, p. 108).

Aristelliger
Reptiles described in 1873